William Laurence Floyd  (13 July 1908 – 6 October 1999) was an Australian politician.

Floyd was born in Broken Hill to miner William Lawrence Floyd and Jessie Ellen Hank. He was a compositor, and a member of Williamstown City Council from 1945 to 1962. In 1955 he was elected to the Victorian Legislative Assembly as the Labor member for Williamstown. He was secretary of the parliamentary party from 1961 to 1970 and retired from politics in 1973, in which year he was appointed an Officer of the Order of the British Empire. Floyd, who was unmarried, died in 1999.

Floyd was also secretary of the Williamstown Football Club between 1935 and 1951, and secretary of the Carlton Football Club between 1951 and 1955.

References

1908 births
1999 deaths
Australian Labor Party members of the Parliament of Victoria
Members of the Victorian Legislative Assembly
Australian Officers of the Order of the British Empire
20th-century Australian politicians
Victoria (Australia) local councillors